Gifford is an English surname. Notable people with the surname include:

 Adam Gifford, Lord Gifford (1820–1887), Scottish advocate; benefactor of the Gifford Lectures endowment
 Alden I. Gifford (1910–1995), American international businessman; diplomat to several countries in Latin America
 Baron Gifford, a title in the peerage of Great Britain and the various holders thereof
 Robert Gifford, 1st Baron Gifford (1779–1826), lawyer, judge, and politician
 Edric Gifford, 3rd Baron Gifford (1849–1911), recipient of the Victoria Cross
 Anthony Maurice Gifford, 6th Baron Gifford (b. 1940), counsel in Guildford Four and Birmingham Six appeals
 Barry Gifford (born 1946), American writer
 Bertha Gifford (1871–1951), American serial killer
 Charles Gifford (Canadian politician) (1821–1896), member of the Ontario provincial legislature
 Charles Gifford (astronomer) (1861–1948), New Zealand explorer and astronomer
 Charles K. Gifford, bank executive at BankBoston and Bank of America, and corporate director of CBS
 Charles L. Gifford (1871–1947), United States Congressman from Massachusetts
 Chris Gifford (field hockey) (born 1966), field hockey striker from Canada
 Chris Gifford (actor), writer and executive producer at Nickelodeon
 Colin Gifford (b. 1936), British railway photographer 
 Denis Gifford (1927–2000), British writer and comics illustrator
 Dino Gifford (1917–2013), Italian footballer
 Duncan Gifford (b. 1972), Australian pianist and piano teacher based in Spain
 Edward Winslow Gifford (1887–1959), American anthropologist at University of California Berkeley
 Frances Gifford (1920–1994), American actress
 Frank Gifford (1930–2015), American athlete and sports commentator, husband of Kathie Lee Gifford
 Gabriel Gifford (1554–1629), Catholic Archbishop of Reims; also known as William Gifford
 George Gifford (disambiguation), several people
 Gilbert Gifford (1560–1590), double agent during years of Elizabeth I and Mary
 Grace Gifford (1888–1955), Irish artist and cartoonist and briefly wife of Joseph Plunkett
 Harry Gifford (songwriter) (1877–1960), English songwriter
 Harry Gifford (1884–1952), English rugby league footballer
 Hugh de Giffard (12th century), Scottish baron
 Josh Gifford (1941–2012), English jockey
 Kathie Lee Gifford, American television host and singer; wife of Frank Gifford
 Luke Gifford (born 1995), American football player
 Maurice Gifford (1859–1910), son of 2nd Baron Gifford, British Army officer
 Norman Gifford (b. 1940), English cricketer
 Oscar S. Gifford (1842–1913), United States Congressman from South Dakota
 Peter Gifford (b. 1955), Australian guitarist for Midnight Oil
 Richard Gifford (1725–1807), British poet
 Rob Gifford, (fl. 1994–present), British-born radio correspondent and author
 Robert Swain Gifford (1840–1905), United States landscape painter
 Robin Gifford (born 1974), Zimbabwean cricketer
 Sally Gifford (born 1981), Canadian actress
 Sanford Robinson Gifford (1823–1880), American landscape painter
 Thomas Gifford (politician) (1854–1935), Canadian politician
 Thomas Gifford (1937–2000), American novelist
 Walter Sherman Gifford (1885–1966), American businessman and president of AT&T Corporation
 Will Gifford (born 1985), English cricketer
 William Gifford (1756–1826), English critic, poet and satirist
 Zerbanoo Gifford, British writer and human rights campaigner

See also 
 Gifford (disambiguation)
 Giffard

English-language surnames

Casey Gifford - "SavageGiff44" - Membership Concierge Tier 3